The 2nd State Council of Ceylon was a meeting of the State Council of Ceylon, with the membership determined by the results of the 1936 state council election held between 22 February and 7 March 1936. The parliament met for the first time on 17 March 1936 and was dissolved on 4 July 1947.

Election
The 2nd state council election was held between 22 February and 7 March 1936 in 43 of the 50 constituencies. The remaining seven constituencies only had a single nomination each and consequently the candidates were elected without a vote.

The new state council met for the first time on 17 March 1936 and elected Waithilingam Duraiswamy, Susantha de Fonseka and R. S. Tennekoon as Speaker, Deputy Speaker and Chairman of Committees and Deputy Chairman of Committees respectively.

Deaths, resignations and removals
 September 1937 – A. E. Rajapakse (Negombo) died. C. E. P. de Silva won the by-election held on 15 January 1938.
 May 1938 – S. O. Canagaratnam (Batticaloa South) died. S. Dharmaretnam won the by-election held in September 1938.
 October 1939 – Neil Hewavitarne (Udugama) died. Simon Abeywickrema won the by-election held 9 March 1940.
 September 1940 – Charles Batuwantudawe (Kalutara) died. Upali Batuwantudawe won the by-election held 21 December 1940. 
 January 1941 – Naysum Saravanamuttu (Colombo North) died. George R. de Silva won the by-election.
 February 1942 – W. A. de Silva (Matara) resigned from office. Thomas Amarasuriya won the by-election held in March 1942.
 February 1942 – C. E. P. de Silva (Negombo) died. H. de Z. Siriwardena won the by-election.
 July 1942 – Philip Gunawardena (Avissawella) vacated office following his escape from detention to India. Bernard Jayasuriya won the by-election held 28 February 1943.
 May 1943 – D. D. Gunasekera (Bandarawela) resigned from office. J. G. Rajakulendran won the by-election held in October 1943.
 May 1943 – R. Sri Pathmanathan (Mannar-Mullaitivu) died. Gnanamuthu Isaac won the by-election on 28 August 1943. At the by-election held in May 1944 Jeganathan Tyagarajah was elected.
 June 1943 – E. W. Abeygunasekera (Nuwara Eliya) resigned. M. D. Banda won the by-election held in October 1943.
 June 1943 – H. A. Goonesekera (Balangoda) resigned. Alexander Francis Molamure won the by-election held in October 1943.
 June 1943 – E. R. Tambimuttu (Trincomalee-Batticaloa) dismissed. V. Nalliah won the by-election.
 July 1943 – J. H. Ilangantileke (Puttalam) died. U. B. Wanninayake won the by-election held on 27 November 1943.
 October 1943 – G. C. Rambukpotha (Bibile) died. Wijeyananda Dahanayake won the by-election in 1944
 August 1944 – Siripala Samarakkody (Narammala) died. Richard Gotabhaya Senanayake won the by-election. 
 April 1945 – H. R. Freeman (Anuradhapura) died. P. B. Bulankulame won the by-election.
 May 1945 – D. M. Rajapaksa (Hambantota) died. D. A. Rajapaksa won the by-election.
 October 1946 – R. C. Kannangara (Morawaka) died. S. A. Wickramasinghe won the by-election.

Members

References

1936 establishments in Ceylon
1947 disestablishments in Ceylon